Neil Fligstein (born May 23, 1951) is an American sociologist and a professor at the University of California, Berkeley. He is known for his work in economic sociology, political sociology, and organizational theory. He has produced both empirical and theoretical works.

His main theoretical works focus on economic sociology, where he has created a "political-cultural" approach to 'markets in corporate control', 'the architecture of markets', and 'markets as politics'. He has used these ideas to study the European Union's attempt to create a single market through cooperative political means. In 2012, he published a book along with Doug McAdam titled A Theory of Fields that proposes a cohesive view of field theory as an approach to study many of the key features of modern life, including politics, the economy, and social movements.

Biography 
Born in Seattle, Washington, Fligstein obtained his BA in 1973 from Reed College, MS from the University of Wisconsin in 1976, and Ph.D. from the University of Wisconsin in 1979.

In 1979, he was appointed Assistant Professor of Sociology at the University of Arizona. From 1980 to 1982, he was at the National Opinion Research Center at the University of Chicago, where he was a NIMH Postdoctoral Fellow and the Senior Study Director. He  returned to the University of Arizona and in 1984 was promoted to Associate Professor, and in 1990 full Professor. From 1984 to 1988 he was the Director of the SBSRI Data and Software Library. In 1991, he moved to the University of California, Berkeley, as Professor of Sociology, where he was the Department Chair from 1992 to 1995. He  is the founder and director of the 'Center for Culture, Organization, and Politics' at Berkeley's Institute for Research on Labor and Employment.

Academic work 
Fligstein's work has mainly focused on his theoretical approach on how new social institutions emerge, remain stable, and are transformed. He has proposed that most of social action takes place in what he calls "meso-level social orders" or "fields", and investigates how individuals and groups come to face-off against one another in social arenas where there is something at stake.

His book with Doug McAdam, A Theory of Fields, makes a very general set of claims about how such orders operate. They argue that at the beginning of such projects, a social movement like process exists because of the fluid conditions in a particular social space. What is at stake, who the players are, and what will end up being the underlying logic of the order, are all up for grabs.

He is also well-known for proposing how to produce a sociological view of action that makes actors key to the creation of these orders. He argues that social skill, and the ability to empathize with others and thereby engage in collective action, is at the basis of gaining cooperation to produce new fields and keep the existing ones going. He posits that actors with social skills are especially important as fields emerge, as they are the ones who provide collective identities that bring people together to cooperate to produce a social order.

Theory of markets 
Fligstein has used his perspective in the context of developing a theory of markets that views the production of a new market as the creation of a meso-level social order or field. Here, competition between firms often results in the creation of markets characterized by incumbents and challengers, where the incumbents' business model dominates how the market operates. He calls such a perspective a "conception of control". He argues that the creation of a market implies a collective stable order that works to mitigate the worse effects of competition. He also views the state as central to the construction of stable markets providing not just a general social order and a legal system, but often as a participant and regulator of many markets. In Architecture of Markets, he develops this approach in a general way and then applies it to understand the emergence of shareholder value capitalism in the U.S., the construction of labor markets across countries, the varieties of capitalism, and globalization. His "markets as politics" approach  is considered to be one of the foundational works in modern economic sociology.

History of the large American corporation 
Fligstein's study of the history of the large American corporation shows how this process evolved in the U.S. from 1870 to 1980, showing how the concept of corporation changed as owners and managers of firms faced challenges from competition.

Construction of a European legal and political system 
Fligstein has also used this framework to understand the construction of the European legal and political system. He has shown how the European Single Market project was mostly aimed at making it easier for businesses already involved in international trade to expand their activities across Europe. He has also shown how the political and legal integration in Brussels promoted trade by making it easier to trade.

His book Euroclash: The EU, European identity, and the Future of Europe shows how economic, social, and political fields have formed around Europe in the wake of the creation of the European Union, presenting analyses that show how the increased economic cooperation across Europe has transformed industries and countries. 

The book explores how this has affected European identities. It demonstrates that around 13% of people in Europe think of themselves mostly as Europeans. These people tend to be well-educated, have professional and managerial jobs, and are politically liberal. About half of Europeans sometimes think of themselves as Europeans. Fligstein goes on to explore how this has played out across various political issues. He demonstrates that if a majority of citizens in the member states support more integration, it will occur. But he argues that most politics remains national and citizens who mainly have a national identity continue to support their nation states as their most democratic representatives.

Honors 
Fligstein was named the Class of 1939 Chancellor's Professor at the University of California, Berkeley in 1997. He was a Fellow at the Center for Advanced Study in the Behavioral Sciences in Palo Atlo, California, in 1994–95; a Guggenheim Fellow in 2004–05; and a Fellow at the Rockefeller Center in Bellagio, Italy, in 2007. Fligstein was elected a member of the American Academy of Arts and Sciences in 2010. He has also been a visiting scholar at many institutions, including the Max Planck Institute in Cologne, the Ecole Normal Superiore-Cachan Sciences-Po in Paris, Center for the Study of Organizations in Paris, the European University Institute in Florence, and the Copenhagen Business School.

Selected publications 
 Fligstein, Neil and Doug McAdam. A Theory of Fields. Oxford University Press, 2012.
 Fligstein, Neil. Euroclash: The EU, European Identity, and the Future of Europe. 2008.
 Fligstein, Neil. The Transformation of Corporate Control. Harvard University Press, 1993.
 Fligstein, Neil. The Architecture of Markets: An economic sociology of twenty-first-century capitalist societies. Princeton University Press, 2001.
 Sweet, Alec Stone, Wayne Sandholtz, and Neil Fligstein, (eds.) The institutionalization of Europe. Oxford University Press, 2001.

Articles, a selection

References

External links 

 Neil Fligstein at UC Berkeley

1951 births
Living people
American business theorists
American sociologists
Reed College alumni
University of Wisconsin–Madison alumni
University of Chicago alumni
University of California, Berkeley faculty
Scientists from Seattle